The men's light heavyweight boxing competition at the 2012 Olympic Games in London was held from 30 July to 12 August at the ExCeL Exhibition Centre.

Twenty-six boxers from 26 nations competed.

Competition format
The competition consisted of a single-elimination tournament. Bronze medals were awarded to both semi-final losers. Bouts were three rounds of three minutes each.

Schedule 
All times are British Summer Time (UTC+1)

Results

Finals
{{Round4
|RD1 = Semi-finals
|RD2 = Final
| team-width=195
| score-width=20

|||11|'''

Top half

Bottom half

Controversy
India's Sumit Sangwan fought well against Brazil's Yamaguchi Falcão before losing the bout 14–15 in what appeared to be a controversial decision in favour of the Brazilian. The decision not only angered the Indian team and the country's sports minister, Ajay Maken, but also led to an official protest which Maken confirmed on Twitter. Some commentators were also surprised by the decision, one describing it as "day-light robbery."

References

Boxing at the 2012 Summer Olympics
Men's events at the 2012 Summer Olympics